Ludwig Becker may refer to:

 Ludwig Becker (explorer) (1808–1861), German-born artist, explorer and naturalist
 Ludwig Hugo Becker (1834–1868), German painter and etcher
 Ludwig Becker (architect) (1855–1940), German architect, church and cathedral master builder
 Ludwig Becker (astronomer) (1860–1947), Scottish astronomer
 Ludwig Becker (politician) (1892–1974), German trades unionist, politician and resistance activist
 Ludwig Becker (pilot) (1911–1943), Luftwaffe fighter ace during World War II